Catumbela is a city and municipality of the Benguela province in Angola. The municipality had a population of 175,805 in 2014.

History 
In the late 18th and early 19th centuries, the Portuguese built Forte de São Pedro to establish themselves in Benguela. Today, the fort is in a dilapidated condition, but plans are being made to restore it and turn it into a museum.

Catumbela was a commune in the municipality of Lobito until 2011, when it became a municipality in its own right.

Transport 
Catumbela is served by a station on the national railway network as well as Catumbela Airport.

See also 
 Railway stations in Angola

References 

Populated places in Benguela Province
2011 establishments in Angola